Mika Kohonen (born May 10, 1977) is a retired Finnish floorball player  and nowdays a floorball coach. He currently coaches Storvreta IBK, a club in the Swedish Super League. He has also played for Balrog IK in SSL and Happee in Salibandyliiga. He also used be a part of Finland's national floorball team for many years both as a player and assistant coach.  

He had his own line of floorball sticks, called MK29, which were released by floorball company Karhu.

In a poll conducted by the Swedish magazine Innebandymagazinet, reporters and national team coaches have voted Kohonen the world's best floorball player for five times; in 2005, 2009, 2010, 2011 and 2012.

His brother, Mikko Kohonen, is also a floorball player.

Achievements
World's Best Floorball Player in 2005, 2009, 2010, 2011 and 2012 by Innebandymagazinet
 World Championships
 World Championships titles: 2008, 2010, 2016, 2018
 World Championships runner-up: 2000, 2002, 2006, 2012, 2014
 World Championships third-placed: 1998, 2004
 World Championships All-Stars selection: 1998, 2000, 2004, 2006, 2010
 Swedish Super League
 Player of the Year: 2001-02
 Rookie of the Year: 2001-02
 Top Point Scorer: 2001-02
 Most Assists: 2001-02, 2002–03
 SSL Champion: 2010, 2011, 2012
 SSL Third-placed: 2005, 2007, 2009
 Salibandyliiga
 Most Assists: 2004-05

References

1977 births
Living people
Finnish floorball players
Sportspeople from Jyväskylä
21st-century Finnish people